Thallium(I) telluride (Tl2Te) is a chemical compound of thallium and tellurium. It has a structure related to that of Tl5Te3. This compound is not well characterized. Its existence has only recently been confirmed by differential scanning calorimetry.

References

Tellurides
Thallium(I) compounds